Eleni-Klaoudia Polak (born 9 September 1996) is a Greek athlete specialising in the pole vault. She represented her country at one outdoor and two indoor European Championships.

Her personal bests in the event are 4.70 metres outdoors (Athens 2020) and 4.71 metres indoors (Piraeus 2021).

She was born in Greece to a Polish father and a Sri Lankan mother.

International competitions

1No mark in the final

References

1996 births
Living people
Greek female pole vaulters
Greek people of Polish descent
Greek people of Sri Lankan descent
Athletes (track and field) at the 2020 Summer Olympics
Olympic athletes of Greece
Athletes from Athens